Apurímac is the name of:

Apurímac River, a river in the south-eastern parts of central Perú
Apurímac Region, a region in the south-eastern parts of central Perú
Three albums by the German new-age band Cusco:
Apurimac (album)
Apurimac II
Apurimac III